{{Infobox writer 
| name          = Aliya Bukhari
| image         =
| imagesize     =
| alt           =
| caption       =
| birth_date    = 

| language      = Urdu
| nationality   = 
| alma_mater    = 
| notableworks  = Dil-e-Muztar and Khamoshi 
| occupation    = Author, Novelist, Screenwriter
}}
Aliya Bukhari is a Pakistani novelist and screenwriter. She started her career through Khawateen digest and has written many popular novels and plays. Most of her novels and stories has been adapted to television plays, including Dil-e-Muztar which earned her wide spread acclaim and recognition. She has been also praised for her series Mere Qatil Mere Dildar, Mausam and Maana Ka Gharana.

Selected work

 Books 

 Titli Ki Uraan
 Shehr e Ashob
 Deewar-e-Shab
 Khushbo Ka Safar
 Khuwab Saraaye 

 Dramas 
 Khamoshi - Hum TV
 Mere Qatil Mere Dildar - Hum TV 
 Dil-e-Muztar - Hum TV Aahista Aahista - Hum TV Mausam - Hum TV Maana Ka Gharana - Hum TV
 Deewar-e-Shab - Hum TV Qaraar - Hum TV Yun Tu Hai Pyar Bohut - Hum TV Bebasi - Hum TV Telefilms 

 Jeena Hai Mushkil

Awards and nominations

 2012: Hum Award for Best Writer Drama Serial - Mere Qatil Mere Dildar (nom)
 2013: Hum Award for Best Writer Drama Serial - Dil-e-Muztar'' (nom)

References

External links
 Aliya Bukhari Novels

Pakistani dramatists and playwrights
Living people
Pakistani women writers
Pakistani novelists
Pakistani screenwriters
Year of birth missing (living people)